The G.I. Bill, formally known as the Servicemen's Readjustment Act of 1944, was a law that provided a range of benefits for some of the returning World War II veterans (commonly referred to as G.I.s). The original G.I. Bill expired in 1956, but the term "G.I. Bill" is still used to refer to programs created to assist some of the U.S. military veterans.

It was largely designed and passed through Congress in 1944 in a bipartisan effort led by the American Legion who wanted to reward practically all wartime veterans. Since the First World War the Legion had been in the forefront of lobbying Congress for generous benefits for war veterans. Roosevelt, by contrast, wanted a much smaller program focused on poor people regardless of military service. As historians Glenn C. Altschuler and Stuart Blumin point out, FDR did not play a significant role in the contours of the bill. At first, Roosevelt shared with nearly everyone the idea that “satisfactory employment,” not educational opportunity, was the key feature of the bill. This changed in the fall of 1944, when Roosevelt's special representative to the European Theatre, Anna M. Rosenberg, returned with her report on the G.I.'s postwar expectations. From her hundreds of interviews with servicemen then fighting in France, it was clear they wanted educational opportunities previously unavailable to them. FDR "lit up," Rosenberg recalled, and subsequent additions to the bill included provisions for higher education.

The final bill provided immediate financial rewards for practically all World War II veterans, thereby avoiding the highly disputed postponed life insurance policy payout for World War I veterans that had caused political turmoil in the 1920s and 1930s. Benefits included low-cost mortgages, low-interest loans to start a business or farm, one year of unemployment compensation, and dedicated payments of tuition and living expenses to attend high school, college, or vocational school. These benefits were available to all veterans who had been on active duty during the war years for at least 90 days and had not been dishonorably discharged.

By 1956, 7.8 million veterans had used the G.I. Bill education benefits, some 2.2 million to attend colleges or universities and an additional 5.6 million for some kind of training program. Historians and economists judge the G.I. Bill a major political and economic success—especially in contrast to the treatments of World War I veterans—and a major contribution to U.S. stock of human capital that encouraged long-term economic growth. It has been criticized for various reasons including increasing racial wealth disparities during the era of Jim Crow.

The original G.I. Bill ended in 1956. The Post-9/11 Veterans Educational Assistance Act of 2008 provided veterans with funding for the full cost of any public college in their state. The G.I. Bill was also modified through the passage of the Forever GI Bill in 2017.

History

On June 22, 1944, the Servicemen's Readjustment Act of 1944, commonly known as the G.I. Bill of Rights, was signed into law. Professor Edwin Amenta states:
Veterans benefits were a bargain for conservatives who feared increasingly high taxation and the extension of New Deal national government agencies.  Veterans benefits would go to a small group without long-term implications for others, and programs would be administered by the VA, diverting power from New Deal bureaucracies.  Such benefits were likely to hamper New Dealers in their attempts to win a postwar battle over a permanent system of social policy for everyone.

During the war, politicians wanted to avoid the postwar confusion about veterans' benefits  that became a political football in the 1920s and 1930s.  Veterans' organizations that had formed after the First World War had millions of members; they mobilized support in Congress for a bill that provided benefits only to veterans of military service, including men and women. Ortiz says their efforts "entrenched the VFW and the Legion as the twin pillars of the American veterans' lobby for decades."

Harry W. Colmery, Republican National Committee chairman and a former National Commander of the American Legion, is credited with writing the first draft of the G.I. Bill. He reportedly jotted down his ideas on stationery and a napkin at the Mayflower Hotel in Washington, D.C.   A group of 8 from the Salem, Illinois American Legion have also been credited with recording their ideas for veteran benefits on napkins and paper. The group included Omar J. McMackin, Earl W. Merrit, Dr. Leonard W. Esper, George H. Bauer, William R. McCauley, James P. Ringley, A.L. Starshak and Illinois Governor, John Stelle who attended the signing ceremony with President Roosevelt.

U.S. Senator Ernest McFarland, (D) AZ, and National Commander of the American Legion Warren Atherton, (R) CA were actively involved in the bill's passage and are known the "fathers of the G.I. Bill."  One might then term Edith Nourse Rogers, (R) MA, who helped write and who co-sponsored the legislation, as the "mother of the G.I. Bill". As with Colmery, her contribution to writing and passing this legislation has been obscured by time.

The bill that President Roosevelt initially proposed had a means test—only poor veterans would get one year of funding; only top-scorers on a written exam would get four years of paid college. The American Legion proposal provided full benefits for all veterans, including women and minorities, regardless of their wealth.

An important provision of the G.I. Bill was low interest, zero down payment home loans for servicemen, with more favorable terms for new construction compared to existing housing. This encouraged millions of American families to move out of urban apartments and into suburban homes.

Another provision was known as the 52–20 clause for unemployment. Unemployed war veterans would receive $20 once a week for 52 weeks for up to one year while they were looking for work. Less than 20 percent of the money set aside for the 52–20 Club was distributed. Rather, most returning servicemen quickly found jobs or pursued higher education.

The recipients did not pay any income tax on the GI benefits, since they were not considered earned income.

The G.I. Bill received criticism for directing some funds to for-profit educational institutions. The G.I. Bill was racially discriminatory, as it was intended to accommodate Jim Crow laws. Due to the discrimination by local and state governments, as well as by private actors in housing and education, the G.I. Bill failed to benefit African Americans as it did with white Americans. Columbia University historian Ira Katznelson described the G.I. Bill as affirmative action for whites. The G.I. Bill has been criticized for increasing racial wealth disparities.

The original G.I. Bill ended in 1956. A variety of benefits have been available to military veterans since the original bill, and these benefits packages are commonly referred to as updates to the G.I. Bill.

After World War II

A greater percentage of Vietnam veterans used G.I. Bill education benefits (72 percent) than World War II veterans (49 percent) or Korean War veterans (43 percent).

Canada
Canada operated a similar program for its World War II veterans, with a similarly beneficial economic impact.

Problems

Racial discrimination

The G.I. Bill aimed to help American World War II veterans adjust to civilian life by providing them with benefits including low-cost mortgages, low-interest loans and financial support. The chairman of the American Veterans Committee at the time, Charles G. Bolte, wrote that federal agencies were consistently discriminating "as though the legislation were earmarked 'For White Veterans Only'". One historian, Ira Katznelson, argues that "the law was deliberately designed to accommodate Jim Crow".  In the New York and northern New Jersey suburbs 67,000 mortgages were insured by the G.I. Bill, but fewer than 100 were taken out by non-whites.

Additionally, some banks and mortgage agencies refused loans to black people. After the war, many people, black people included, returned to their former lives of poverty, making it difficult for them to pursue the higher education opportunities afforded by the G.I. Bill.

In the South, which was still segregated at that time, some universities refused to admit black people until the Civil Rights movement. Colleges accepting black people in the South initially numbered 100. Some of those institutions were of lower quality, with 28 of them classified as sub-baccalaureate. Only seven states offered post-baccalaureate training, while no accredited engineering or doctoral programs were available for blacks. These institutions were all smaller than white or non-segregated universities, often facing a lack of resources.

By 1946, only one fifth of the 100,000 black people who had applied for educational benefits had been registered in college. Furthermore, historically black colleges and universities (HBCUs) came under increased pressure as rising enrollments and strained resources forced them to turn away an estimated 20,000 veterans. HBCUs were already the poorest colleges. HBCU resources were stretched even thinner when veterans' demands necessitated an expansion in the curriculum beyond the traditional "preach and teach" course of study.

Though black people encountered many obstacles in their pursuit of G.I. benefits, the bill greatly expanded the population of African Americans attending college and graduate school. In 1940, enrollment at Black colleges was 1.08% of total U.S. college enrollment. By 1950 it had increased to 3.6%. However, these gains were limited almost exclusively to Northern states, and the educational and economic gap between white and black nationally widened under the effects of the G.I. Bill. With 79 percent of the black population living in southern states, educational gains were limited to a small portion of black Americans.

Merchant marine
Congress did not include the merchant marine veterans in the original G.I. Bill, even though they were considered military personnel in times of war in accordance with the Merchant Marine Act of 1936. As President Roosevelt (Democrat) signed the G.I. Bill in June 1944 he said, "I trust Congress will soon provide similar opportunities to members of the merchant marine who have risked their lives time and time again during war for the welfare of their country." Now that the youngest World War II veterans are in their 90s, efforts have been made to recognize the merchant mariners' contributions by giving some benefits to the remaining survivors. In 2007, three different bills to address this issue were introduced in Congress, of which one only passed in the House of Representatives. The Belated Thank You to the Merchant Mariners of World War II Act of 2007 establishes Merchant Mariner equality compensation payments by the Secretary of Veterans Affairs of a monthly benefit of $1,000 to each individual who, between December 7, 1941, and December 31, 1946, was a documented member of the U.S. Merchant Marine (including Army Transport Service and the Naval Transport Service).  This bill was introduced to the House by Rep. Bob Filner (D-California) in 2007 and passed the House but not the Senate so did not become law. Another attempt to notice Merchant Marines in the G.I. Bill was the 21st Century GI Bill of Rights Act of 2007, introduced by Sen. Hillary Clinton, Entitles basic educational assistance to Armed Forces or reserves who, after September 11, 2001: (1) are deployed overseas; or (2) serve for an aggregate of at least two years or, before such period, are discharged due to a service-connected disability, hardship, or certain medical conditions. Entitles such individuals to 36 months of educational assistance. Rep. Jeff Miller (R-Florida)  got the house to pass easier access to the GI Bill by "verifying honorable service as a coast-wise merchant seaman between December 7, 1941, and December 31, 1946, for purposes of eligibility for veterans' benefits under the GI Bill Improvement Act of 1977." It passed the House and went no further.

Colleges that target veterans
After the GI Bill was instituted in the 1940s, a number of "fly-by-night" vocational schools were created. Some of these for-profit colleges still target veterans, who are excluded from the 90-10 rule for federal funding. This loophole encourages for-profit colleges to target and aggressively recruit veterans and their families. Legislative efforts to close the 90-10 loophole have failed.

According to the GI Bill Comparison Tool, the largest recipients of GI Bill Funds are 
University of Phoenix  $190,941,289 
University of Maryland Global Campus $67,806,473 
American Public University System  $58,773,186 
Full Sail University  $48,678,834 
Colorado Technical University $48,024,079 
Arizona State University $42,759,321 
Liberty University  $33,938,851 
National University  $32,080,876 
Southern New Hampshire University $30,986,463

Lead generators like QuinStreet have also acted as third parties to recruit veterans for subprime colleges.

Content
All veteran education programs are found in law in Title 38 of the United States Code.  Each specific program is found in its own Chapter in Title 38.

Unlike scholarship programs, the Montgomery GI Bill (MGIB) requires a financial commitment from the service member. However, if the benefit is not used, the service member cannot recoup whatever money was paid into the system.

In some states, the National Guard does offer true scholarship benefits, regardless of past or current MGIB participation.

Chapter 30 (Montgomery GI Bill)
In 1984, former Mississippi Democratic Congressman Gillespie V. "Sonny" Montgomery revamped the G.I. Bill. From 1984 until 2008, this version of the law was called "The Montgomery G.I. Bill". The Montgomery GI Bill — Active Duty (MGIB) stated that active duty members had to forfeit $100 per month for 12 months; if they used the benefits, they received  $1564 monthly as a full-time student (tiered at lower rates for less-than-full-time) for a maximum of 36 months of education benefits. This benefit could be used for both degree and certificate programs, flight training, apprenticeship/on-the-job training, and correspondence courses if the veteran was enrolled full-time. Part-time veteran students received less, but for a proportionately longer period. This meant that for every month the veteran received benefits at the half-time, the veteran's benefits were only charged for 1/2 of a month. Veterans from the reserve had different eligibility requirements and different rules on receiving benefits (see Ch. 1606, Ch. 1607 and Ch. 33). MGIB could also be used while active, which only reimbursed the cost of tuition and fees. Each service has additional educational benefit programs for active duty members. Most delay using MGIB benefits until after separation, discharge or retirement.

"Buy-Up" option
The "Buy-Up" option, allows active duty members to forfeit up to $600 more toward their MGIB. For every dollar the service member contributes, the federal government contributes $8.  Those who forfeit the maximum ($600) will receive, upon approval, an additional $150 per month for 36 months, or a total of $5400. This allows the veteran to receive $4,800 in additional funds ($5400 total minus the $600 contribution to receive it), but not until after leaving active duty (unless the tuition of a term is higher than the monthly MGIB rate would pay).  The additional contribution must be made while still on active duty. It is available for G.I. Bill recipients using either Ch. 30 or Ch. 1607, but cannot be extended beyond 36 months if a combination of G.I. Bill programs are used.  It will pay past 36 months of eligibility, by being paid to the end of the term where entitlement is exhausted.

The "buy-up" option is not to be confused with a "kicker".  A kicker is an additional payment as well, however it is a contractual incentive for specific jobs, and not an optional offering soldiers can pay into.

Time limit/eligibility
MGIB benefits may be used up to 10 years from the date of last discharge or release from active duty. The 10-year period can be extended by the amount of time a service member was prevented from training during that period because of a disability or because he/she was held by a foreign government or power.

The 10-year period can also be extended if one reenters active duty for 90 days or more after becoming eligible. The extension ends 10 years from the date of separation from the later period. Periods of active duty of fewer than 90 days qualify for extensions only if one was separated for one of the following:
 A service-connected disability
 A medical condition existing before active duty
 Hardship

For those eligible based on two years of active duty and four years in the Selected Reserve (also known as "call to service"), they have 10 years from their release from active duty, or 10 years from the completion of the four-year Selected Reserve obligation to use MGIB benefits.

At this time, service members cannot recoup any monies paid into the MGIB program should it not be utilized.

Top-up option
Service members may use GI bill in conjunction with Military Tuition Assistance (MilTA) to help with payments above the MilTA CAP. This will reduce the total benefit available once the member leaves service. Veterans Educational Assistance Improvements Act of 2010 (Public Law 111-377, January 4, 2011), Section 111, amended Title 38, U.S. Code, by adding section 3322(h), "Bar to Duplication of Eligibility Based on a Single Event or Period of Service," which does not allow the Department of Veterans Affairs to establish eligibility for a Service Member under more than one education benefit. If a service member applies for Montgomery GI Bill benefits (such as the Top-up option to augment Tuition Assistance) and entered service on/after August 1, 2011, then they must incur a subsequent period of service to convert to the Post 9/11 GI Bill. If the service member cannot incur another period of service, they are not eligible to convert.  The VA considers a service member has elected a GI Bill upon submission of VA Form 22-1990.and VA approval and issues a Certificate of Eligibility.

Educational
 College, business
 Technical or vocational courses
 Correspondence courses
 Apprenticeship/job training
 Flight training (usually limited to 60% for Ch. 30, see Ch. 33 for more flight information)

Under this bill, benefits may be used to pursue an undergraduate or graduate degree at a college or university, a cooperative training program, or an accredited independent study program leading to a degree.

Chapter 31 (Vocational Rehabilitation Program)
"Chapter 31" is a vocational rehabilitation program that serves eligible active duty servicemembers and veterans with service-connected disabilities.  This program promotes the development of suitable, gainful employment by providing vocational and personal adjustment counseling, training assistance, a monthly subsistence allowance during active training, and employment assistance after training. Independent living services may also be provided to advance vocational potential for eventual job seekers, or to enhance the independence of eligible participants who are presently unable to work.

In order to receive an evaluation for Chapter 31 vocational rehabilitation and/or independent living services, those qualifying as a "servicemember" must have a memorandum service-connected disability rating of 20% or greater and apply for vocational rehabilitation services. Those qualifying as "veterans" must have received, or eventually receive, an honorable or other-than-dishonorable discharge, have a VA service-connected disability rating of 10% or more, and apply for services. Law provides for a 12-year basic period of eligibility in which services may be used, which begins on latter of separation from active military duty or the date the veteran was first notified of a service-connected disability rating. In general, participants have 48 months of program entitlement to complete an individual vocational rehabilitation plan. Participants deemed to have a "serious employment handicap" will generally be granted exemption from the 12-year eligibility period and may receive additional months of entitlement as necessary to complete approved plans.

Chapter 32 (Veterans Educational Assistance Program)
The Veterans Educational Assistance Program (VEAP) is available for those who first entered active duty between January 1, 1977, and June 30, 1985, and elected to make contributions from their military pay to participate in this education benefit program. Participants' contributions are matched on a $2 for $1 basis by the Government with a maximum allowable participant contribution of $2,700. (Maximum possible government contribution: $5,400. Maximum possible benefit: $8,100.) This benefit may be used for degree and certificate programs, flight training, apprenticeship/on-the-job training and correspondence courses.

Chapter 33 (Post-9/11)

Congress, in the summer of 2008, approved an expansion of benefits beyond the current G.I. Bill program for military veterans serving since the September 11 attacks originally proposed by Democratic Senator Jim Webb.  Beginning in August 2009, recipients became eligible for greatly expanded benefits, or the full cost of any public college in their state. The new bill also provides a housing allowance and $1,000 a year stipend for books, among other benefits.

The VA announced in September 2008 that it would manage the new benefit itself instead of hiring an outside contractor after protests by veteran's organizations and the American Federation of Government Employees.  Veterans Affairs Secretary James B. Peake stated that although it was "unfortunate that we will not have the technical expertise from the private sector," the VA "can and will deliver the benefits program on time."

President Obama Launches Post-9/11 GI Bill
August 3, 2009 | 12:01

President Obama marks the launch of the Post-9/11 GI Bill, which will provide comprehensive education benefits to our veterans. The bill will provide our veterans the skills and trainings they need to be successful in the future, and is part of the Presidents plan to build a new foundation for the 21st century. August 3, 2009.

In December 2010 Congress passed the Post-9/11 Veterans Education Assistance Improvements Act of 2010. The new law, often referred to as G.I. Bill 2.0, expands eligibility for members of the National Guard to include time served on Title 32 or in the full-time Active Guard and Reserve (AGR). It does not, however, cover members of the Coast Guard Reserve who have served under Title 14 orders performing duties comparable to those performed by National Guard personnel under Title 32 orders.

The new law also includes:

enrollment periods. In this case if the veteran is full-time, and his or her maximum BAH rate is $1500 per month, then he or she will receive (13/30)x$1500 = $650 for the end of the first period of enrollment, then the veteran will receive (10/30)x$1500 = $500 for the beginning of the second period of enrollment. Effectively, the change in break-pay means the veteran will receive $1150 per month for August instead of $1500 per month. This has a significant impact in December - January BAH payments since most Colleges have 2-4 week breaks.

Another change enables active-duty servicemembers and their G.I. Bill-eligible spouses to receive the annual $1,000 book stipend (pro-rated for their rate of pursuit), adds several vocational, certification and OJT options, and removes the state-by-state tuition caps for veterans enrolled at publicly funded colleges and universities.

Changes to Ch. 33 also includes a new $17,500 annual cap on tuition and fees coverage for veterans attending private colleges and foreign colleges and universities.

Chapter 34 (Vietnam Era G.I. Bill)
The Vietnam Era G.I. Bill provided educational assistance for service members serving on Active Duty for more than 180 days with any portion of that time falling between January 31, 1955, and January 1, 1977.  To be eligible, service members must have been discharged under conditions other than dishonorable.  There was no service member contribution for this program like Chapter 30 or 32.  This program was sunset on December 31, 1989.

Chapter 35 (Survivors' and Dependents' Educational Assistance Program)
The Survivors' and Dependents' Educational Assistance (DEA) Program delivers education and training advantages to dependents from eligible resources to veterans who have either have a terminal illness due to a service-related condition, or who were called to active duty or had a disability related to serving in the American forces in the United States. That program gives around 50 months of education benefits. However, there are still more opportunities. The benefits may be used for degree and certificate programs, apprenticeship, and on the job training. Wives of veterans and former wives are offered free courses occasionally.

Chapter 1606 (Montgomery GI Bill- Selective Reserve)
The Montgomery G.I. Bill — Selected Reserve (MGIB-SR) program may be available to members of the
Selected Reserve, including all military branch reserve components as well as the Army National Guard and Air National Guard. This benefit may be used for degree and certificate programs, flight training, apprenticeship/on-the-job training and correspondence courses.

Chapter 1607 (Reserve Educational Assistance Program)

The Reserve Educational Assistance Program (REAP) was available to all reservists who, after September 11, 2001, complete 90 days or more of active duty service "in support of contingency operations." This benefit provided reservists return from active duty with up to 80% of the active duty (Chapter 30) G.I. Bill benefits as long as they remained active participants in the reserves.  Chapter 1607 was sunset on November 25, 2019, to make way for the Post 9/11 G.I. Bill.

MGIB comparison chart

Other legal safeguards
The State of California has an 85-15 rule that aims to prevent predatory for-profit colleges and "fly-by-night schools" from targeting veterans.

In 2012, President Barack Obama issued Executive Order 13607 to ensure that military service members, veterans, and their families would not be aggressively targeted by sub-prime colleges.

GI Bill Comparison Tool and college choice
The Department of Veterans Affairs maintains a website for veterans to compare colleges that use the GI Bill, in order to use their educational benefits wisely.

VA also has a GI Bill Feedback System for veterans to lodge their complaints about schools they are attending.

References

Further reading

 Abrams, Richard M. "The U.S. Military and Higher Education: A Brief History." Annals of the American Academy of Political and Social Science (1989) 404 pp. 15–28.
 Altschuler, Glenn C. and Stuart M. Blumin. The GI Bill: a new deal for veterans (2009), brief scholarly overview 
 Bennett, Michael J. When Dreams Came True: The G.I. Bill and the Making of Modern America (New York: Brassey's Inc., 1996)
 Bound, John,  and Sarah Turner. "Going to War and Going to College: Did World War II and the G.I. Bill Increase Educational Attainment for Returning Veterans?" Journal of Labor Economics 20#4 (2002), pp. 784–815 in JSTOR
 Boulton, Mark. Failing our Veterans: The G.I. Bill and the Vietnam Generation (NYU Press, 2014).
  Clark, Daniel A. "'The two joes meet—Joe College, Joe Veteran': The GI Bill, college education, and postwar American culture". History of Education Quarterly (1998),  38#2, pp. 165–189.
 Frydl, Kathleen. The G.I. Bill  (Cambridge University Press, 2009)
 
 Jennings, Audra. Out of the Horrors of War: Disability Politics in World War II America (U of Pennsylvania Press, 2016). 288 pp. 
 Mettler, Suzanne. Soldiers to Citizens: The G.I. Bill and the Making of the Greatest Generation (Oxford University Press, 2005). online; excerpt
 Nagowski, Matthew P. "Inopportunity of Gender: The G.I. Bill and the Higher Education of the American Female, 1939-1954" Cornell University ILR Collection" (2005) online; statistical approach
 Nam, Charles B. "The Impact of the 'GI Bills' on the Educational Level of the Male Population" Social Forces 43 (October 1964): 26-32. 
 Olson, Keith.  "The G. I. Bill and Higher Education: Success and Surprise," American Quarterly Vol. 25, No. 5 (December 1973) 596-610. in JSTORin JSTOR
 Olson, Keith, The G.I. Bill, The Veterans, and The Colleges (Lexington: University Press of Kentucky, 1974)
 Peeps, J. M. Stephen. "A B.A. for the G.I. . . . Why?" History of Education Quarterly 24#4 (1984) pp 513-25.
 Ross, David B. Preparing for Ulysses: Politics and Veterans During World War II (Columbia University Press, 1969).
 
 Van Ells, Mark D. To Hear Only Thunder Again: America's World War II Veterans Come Home.  Lanham, MD: Lexington Books, 2001.
Woods, Louis, “Almost ‘No Negro Veteran…Could Get a Loan:’ African Americans, the GI Bill, and the NAACP Campaign Against Residential Segregation, 1917-1960,” The Journal of African American History'', Vol. 98, No. 3 (Summer 2013) pp. 392–417.

External links

 Official
 
 General information
 GI Bill Forum
 The American Legion's MyGIBill.org
 The Department of Veteran Affairs' GI Bill website
 Central Committee for Conscientious Objectors analysis of the MGIB
 Education Fact Sheet for Guard & Reserve Members
 Education Benefits Available by States
 Guide to the GI Bill Oral Histories 2003-2004
 Web-Enable Education Benefits System
 GI Bill top up program

1944 in American law
1944 in military history
Higher education in the United States
History of the American Legion
History of veterans' affairs in the United States
Legal history of the United States
Military education and training in the United States
Politics of World War II
United States federal education legislation
United States federal legislation articles without infoboxes
United States federal veterans' affairs legislation
United States military pay and benefits